Robert F. Wagner Jr. Park (also known as Wagner Park) is a green space in the Battery Park City neighborhood of Manhattan, New York City. The park is sited on landfill from the World Trade Center site  and opened in 1996. It was designed by a partnership of Rodolfo Machado, Jorge Silvetti, Hannah/Olin, and Lynden B. Miller. The park is named after Robert F. Wagner Jr., who helped negotiate the 1979 master plan for Battery Park City before his sudden death in 1993. The park is just north of City Pier A at the southern end of Manhattan.

As of 2022, the park was being planned for demolition, although locals are fighting to save the park. The demolition is slated as part of a flood resiliency project, and the plans call for razing and rebuilding the park. In response to the public pressure, the committee has enlarged the area dedicated to lawns in the plans, although the rebuilt lawns would still contain 10 percent less green space.

References

Battery Park City
Parks in Manhattan
Urban public parks